The Ikara missile was an Australian ship-launched anti-submarine missile, named after an Australian Aboriginal word for "throwing stick". By flying to a distant target, the engagement time was dramatically shorter than provided by short-range weapons, giving the target less time to respond.

Design and development
With the development of nuclear power, submarine performance, especially speed, improved dramatically, as did the threat they posed. Simultaneously, sonar detection capability at long range was also improving significantly, but only short-range weapons were available to surface escort warships.

Known initially under the Rainbow Code name Blue Duck, the Ikara was a "rocket-thrown weapon" with similarities to the French Malafon. It differed from Malafon in that the torpedo was semi-recessed in the missile body rather than mounted in the nose. Ikara was generally considered a superior system to ASROC as it was accurately guided during flight to ensure optimal targeting. A submarine would be aware from sonar contacts that it was about to be attacked and could engage in evasive changes of course. In ASROC's flight time to maximum range of 55 seconds, a submarine travelling at  could move  from its position at launch, and a prediction would be made of the submarine's likely position at torpedo splashdown. The range of the acoustic seeker was later improved.

The Turana target drone was designed and built in Australia as a development of the Ikara anti-submarine weapon system. It was a target drone with remote control that was launched from the Ikara launcher for use in naval anti-aircraft target practice.

Ikara was powered by a two-stage in-line solid-fuel Murawa rocket engine developed by Bristol Aerojet Ltd in the UK and was guided by radio command link until it reached the vicinity of the submarine, determined by the ship's sonar contact, where it would first jettison the rear ventral fin and torpedo rear covering and then release its 12.7 inch Mark 44 or Mark 46 acoustically-guided anti-submarine torpedo. The torpedo payload would descend by parachute while the missile itself was programmed to splashdown some distance away to avoid interference with the acoustic torpedo's seeker head. The torpedo would then begin a circular search pattern to find and lock onto a submarine contact.

In 1982, work began on an improved version, the Super Ikara. While test launches were carried out in 1986, the project was abandoned due to a lack of interest from the UK.

British variant differences

A variant fitted to the British Royal Navy's s differed in several respects from the original Australian version designed to operate in the Pacific. The Royal Navy required changes to the frequencies used in order to enable Ikara to be used in the NATO area, where different electronic warfare conditions and international frequency agreements had to be taken into account. Neither the Australian-built analogue computer system, nor the American Bunker Ramo Corporation 133 digital computer system, used in most RAN systems, were compatible with the ADA digital battle-control computers being fitted into Royal Navy ships, and this was also changed. The UK-manufactured version of the Mark 44 torpedo also differed from the US-built version purchased by the Australians for their Ikara missiles. The British also required the missile payload to be changeable aboard ship to permit different payload combinations to be used, including a nuclear depth bomb (NDB) option, and this, together with the different internal ship layouts required further changes to the missile, storage and handling arrangements. The Australian practice was to combine the missile and payload at a shore-based ordnance facility and issuing the complete unit to a ship; repair or maintenance was only possible ashore. In the British ships, the changes made enabled a faulty torpedo on a missile in working order to be replaced,  increasing the flexibility of use of very limited stocks aboard; especially on lengthy deployments around the globe, as was more common with British ships than their Australian counterparts. The facility to change a torpedo payload aboard ship also permitted a change from a conventional torpedo to a WE.177A NDB, a facility for a nuclear option that was not needed on ships fitted with the Australian variant of Ikara. The British launcher also differed, covered by a zareba (breakwater) when not in use to prevent icing in northern waters, and extremely accurate in training in bearing.  It was also notoriously noisy.

Ikara-fitted ships
Ikara was fitted to all of the Royal Australian Navy (RAN)  frigates/destroyer escorts and  guided-missile destroyers. There were three main variants of the system fitted to RAN ships; F1, F2, and F3. The F1 system, using an analogue computer, a single launcher and without a data link, was fitted to HMA Ships  and  only. The F3 system, with a digital computer, digital display, single launcher and a digital data link, was fitted to the other four River class ships. HMAS Stuart and Derwent were fitted with F3/0 systems during Half-life refits during the 1980s. The F2 system, using a digital computer, digital display, two launchers and with a digital data link, was fitted to the three Perth-class destroyers. The digital computer used by the RAN was the AN/UYK-1 NTDS (Naval Tactical Data System) (Bunker Ramo 133). The Ikara missile was withdrawn from service by the RAN in 1991.

Ikara was also operated by the Brazilian Navy, Royal Navy, and Royal New Zealand Navy. It was phased out in the early 1990s due to the obsolescence of the Mk 44 torpedo and inability to carry the newer and heavier Mk 46 or Stingray. The British purchased Ikara to fit to the two new CVA-01 aircraft carriers planned (and later cancelled) in the 1960s, and their escorts, the Type 82 destroyers, of which only one,  was built.

Operators

Former operators 
 
 Royal Australian Navy
 
 Brazilian Navy
 
 Chilean Navy
 
 Royal New Zealand Navy
 
 Royal Navy

Notes

References

External links

 Middle Watch: Ikara
 AdAstra: IKARA and ADASTRA 
 Destroyers.org: The Anti-Submarine Rocket
 Gyrodyne Helicopters.com: Asroc

Anti-submarine missiles of Australia
Naval weapons of Australia
Naval weapons of the United Kingdom
Guided missiles of the Cold War
Cold War military equipment of Australia
Military equipment introduced in the 1960s